Woodhead is a surname. Notable people with the surname include:

Abraham Woodhead (1609–1678), English writer
Kalia Woodhead (born 2001), Intelligence Analyst
Chris Woodhead (1946–2015), British educationalist
Cynthia Woodhead (born 1964), American Olympic swimmer
Danny Woodhead (born 1985), American football running back
Dennis Woodhead (1925–1995), English footballer
Ernest Woodhead (1857–1944), English rugby player
Frank Woodhead (1868–1943), English cricketer
German Sims Woodhead (1855–1921), English pathologist
Joseph Woodhead (1824–1913), English newspaper proprietor and politician
Leslie Woodhead, British documentary filmmaker.
Linda Woodhead (born 1964), British sociologist
Peter Woodhead (born 1939), Royal Navy officer
Red Woodhead (1851–1881), American baseball player
Robert Woodhead, entrepreneur, software engineer and former game programmer
Simon Woodhead (born 1962), English footballer
Thomas William Woodhead (1863-1940), English plant ecologist. 
Wendy Woodhead, English table tennis player